"It's Lonely Out Tonite" is a song co-written and recorded by American country music artist Eddie Rabbitt.  It was released in August 1990 as the third single from the album Jersey Boy.  The song reached #32 on the Billboard Hot Country Singles & Tracks chart.  The song was written by Rabbitt and Reed Nielsen.

Chart performance

References

1990 singles
1990 songs
Eddie Rabbitt songs
Songs written by Reed Nielsen
Songs written by Eddie Rabbitt
Song recordings produced by Richard Landis
Capitol Records Nashville singles